Nikolai Yevgenyevich Zaytsev (born 1 June 1989) is a Russian former professional footballer. He played as central midfielder or centre-back.

Club career
He made his debut in the Russian Premier League for FC Kuban Krasnodar on 6 October 2007 in a game against PFC Krylia Sovetov Samara.

Career statistics

Club

Notes

References

1989 births
People from Novorossiysk
Living people
Russian footballers
Russia youth international footballers
Association football defenders
FC Kuban Krasnodar players
FC Chernomorets Novorossiysk players
Russian Premier League players
FC Mordovia Saransk players
FC Volga Nizhny Novgorod players
FC Spartak Vladikavkaz players
FC Tosno players
FC Amkar Perm players
PFC CSKA Moscow players
FC SKA-Khabarovsk players
FC Orenburg players
FC Neftekhimik Nizhnekamsk players
FC Fakel Voronezh players
Sportspeople from Krasnodar Krai